Push is a Canadian television documentary series, which premiered on February 24, 2023, on CBC Television. The series profiles the "Wheelie Peeps", a group of wheelchair users in Edmonton, Alberta who have come together as a circle of friends around Benveet Gill, the co-founder of the city's ReYu Paralysis Recovery Centre.

The cast members of the show include Brian McPherson, a sledge hockey player, and his girlfriend Victoria Berezovich, an advocate for Charcot–Marie–Tooth disease awareness; Natasha Urkow, a quadriplegic playwright and actress who is navigating the complications of pregnancy; Brittany Neunzig, a teacher who makes disability awareness videos for YouTube; Aleem Jaffer, an employment readiness consultant who is newly married to his husband Nick; and Riccardo Baldini, a concert pianist who is relearning how to play the instrument adaptively following a spinal cord injury.

References

2023 Canadian television series debuts
2020s Canadian documentary television series
2020s Canadian LGBT-related television series
CBC Television original programming
Television shows about disability